The Wales national under-21 football team, also known as the Wales U21s, is the national under-21 football team of Wales and is controlled by the Football Association of Wales. The team competes in the UEFA European Under-21 Football Championship, held every two years. To date Wales haven't yet qualified for the finals tournament but in recent years have shown good form, losing in a playoff (5–4) to England in the 2009 qualifying campaign and finishing second in their group two years later, after leading their group until their last game Wales only needed a draw to qualify for the play-offs but lost 1–0 away to Italy.

The under-21 team came into existence following the realignment of UEFA's youth competitions in 1976. A goalless draw in a friendly against England at Wolverhampton Wanderers' Molineux Stadium was Wales U21s' first result.

The national under-21 team is the highest level of youth football in Wales, and is open to any players who were born in Wales or whose parents or grandparents were born in Wales. This team is for Welsh players aged 21 or under at the start of a two-year European Under-21 Football Championship campaign, so players can be, and often are, up to 23 years old. Also in existence are teams for Under-20s (for non-UEFA tournaments), Under-19s and Under 17s. As long as they are eligible, players can play at any level, making it possible to play for the U21s, senior side and again for the U21s.

Recent history
Historically the team was viewed by the Welsh national management as a hole to be filled rather than a team to be used to nurture young international players. Many of the great Welsh players spent little time at the under-21 team level. Ryan Giggs only made one appearance for the under-21 team before making his senior debut against Germany the next day.

From 2004 onward however, the former Wales national football team manager John Toshack and former Wales Under 21 manager Brian Flynn used the under-21 team to create a pool of youthful Welsh talent. The team now has a much better tracking system of young Welsh players, and has seen a marked improvement in players and team results. Recent results have seen them achieve big wins against Estonia (5–1), Northern Ireland (4–0) and France (4–2).

Players who have made the step from the U21s to attain over 50 caps for the senior squad are Gary Speed, Simon Davies, Carl Robinson, Craig Bellamy, Robert Earnshaw, James Collins, John Hartson, Andy King, Joe Ledley, Sam Vokes, Wayne Hennessey, Chris Gunter, Gareth Bale, Aaron Ramsey and Joe Allen.

On 15 May 2008, they played a friendly against England U21s to mark the 100th match in the history of the side, losing 2–0.

A 3–0 victory against Romania in September 2008 meant that the Under-21 side finished top of their qualifying group for the first time in their history. It meant Wales would go into a two-legged play-off against England in October 2008 for a place in the finals of the 2009 UEFA Under-21 Championship to be played in Sweden. Wales lost the playoff 5–4 over the course of two legs. Losing 3–2 at home in the first leg and drawing 2–2 away in the second.

Wales started their qualifying campaign for the 2013 UEFA European Under-21 Football Championship with a 1–0 away win against Andorra, a 3–1 away loss against Montenegro, a 1–0 home win against Montenegro, a 1–0 home defeat against Czech Republic and a 0–0 away draw against Armenia.

In May 2012 Brian Flynn vacated his position as Wales under-21 manager at the end of his contract and in July 2012 Geraint Williams was appointed team manager  Williams resigned as team manager on 5 December 2016. On 15 March 2017 it was announced that former Port Vale and Northampton Town manager Rob Page had left his position on the coaching staff at Nottingham Forest to become Wales under-21 manager. In August 2019 Page was appointed assistant coach to the senior Wales squad under Ryan Giggs with Paul Bodin stepping up from the Under 19's to manage the Under 21 team.

In November 2021, Wales picked up their biggest ever win at under-21 level when they beat Gibraltar 7–0 in a qualifier for the 2023 UEFA European Under-21 Championship. In July 2022 Bodin's contract with Wales Under-21 was terminated by mutual consent. In September 2022, Matt Jones was appointed as manager.

Players

Latest squad
Players born on or after 1 January 2002 are eligible for the 2025 UEFA European Under-21 Championship.

Wales squad for the friendly match against Scotland in Spain on 26 March 2023. 

Caps and goals as of 14 June 2022. Players in bold have attained full international caps. Clubs as of the date of the announcement.

Recent call-ups
The following players have also been called up to the Wales under-21 squad and remain eligible. Players in bold have caps for the senior team.

SEN

Key
SUS = Suspended for next match.
SEN = Called up to senior squad.
INJ = Withdrew from the squad due to injury.
WD = Withdrew from the squad for non injury issue.

See also
 UEFA European Under-21 Football Championship
 Football Association of Wales
 Wales national football team
 Wales national under-20 football team
 Wales national under-19 football team
 Wales national under-18 football team
 Wales national under-17 football team

References

External links
 UEFA Under-21 website Contains full results archive.
 The Rec.Sport.Soccer Statistics Foundation Contains full record of U21/U23 Championships.
 FAW official site Contains fixtures/results and news for every Wales national football team.

 
European national under-21 association football teams
Youth football in Wales